This is a list of works by J. M. G. Le Clézio, the French Nobel Laureate.

Novels

Children's books

Short stories

La Fièvre
Translated by Daphne Woodward in 1966 as "The Fever"

Mondo et autres histoires

La ronde et autres faits divers
"La ronde et autres faits divers" was translated into English as "The Round & Other Cold Hard Facts" by C. Dickson.

Printemps et autres saisons

Awaité Pawana

La Fête chantée et autres essais de thème amérindien

Cœur brûle et autres romances

Tabataba suivi de pawana

Essays

Travel diaries

Voyage à Rodrigues

Raga. Approche du continent invisible

Collection translations

Les Prophéties du Chilam Balam

Translated by the Author into French

Relation de Michoacan
Translation of "Relación de Michoacan" from medieval Spanish into French. This codex, copied in the years 1539–1540, contains the narration of a Franciscan friar, whom the American historian Dr. Benedict Warren identified as Fray Gerónimo de Alcalá.

Sirandanes

Translated by the Author into French

Petit lexique de la langue créole et des oiseaux

References

External links

Bibliographies by writer
Bibliographies of French writers
Children's literature bibliographies